Kaj Kristian Stenvall (born 25 December 1951 in Tampere) is a Finnish artist who became internationally famous when he began his career in 1989 for painting what his site describes as "a very familiar looking duck." Many have likened this duck to the Donald Duck of Disney comics.

References

External links
Kaj Stenvall Homepage and Internet Gallery

1951 births
Living people
People from Tampere
Swedish-speaking Finns
20th-century Finnish painters
21st-century Finnish painters